The Japan Spotlight is a bimonthly publication by the Japan Economic Foundation (JEF). It was formerly called the Journal of Japanese Trade & Industry (JTI).

History and profile
The publication was established in 1982. It was originally focused on the economy of Japan but its focus was later broadened to culture, history, and international politics in addition to the economy.

The journal, when it was published as the Journal of Japanese Trade & Industry, has stated that it is independent of the Japanese government, and Malcolm Trevor, author of Japan - Restless Competitor: The Pursuit of Economic Nationalism, states that it "gives no outward sign of putting forward official views". Trevor argues that the publication is in fact connected to the Japanese government and that "it is to all intents and purposes an official organ, even if it may not look it."

References

External links
 Japan Spotlight
 Journal of Japanese Trade & Industry (Archive) (1997-2000)

1982 establishments in Japan
Bi-monthly magazines
Business magazines published in Japan
Magazines established in 1982
Professional and trade magazines
Magazines published in Tokyo